The list of shipwrecks in 1809 includes ships sunk, wrecked, or otherwise lost during 1809.

January

1 January

2 January

3 January

4 January

5 January

6 January

7 January

8 January

9 January

10 January

11 January

14 January

15 January

16 January

17 January

19 January

20 January

21 January

22 January

23 January

24 January

25 January

26 January

27 January

28 January

29 January

30 January

31 January

Unknown date

February

1 February

2 February

3 February

5 February

6 February

7 February

8 February

9 February

10 February

12 February

13 February

17 February

18 February

20 February

21 February

24 February

26 February

27 February

Unknown date

March

6 March

9 March

11 March

14 March

15 March

17 March

19 March

21 March

22 March

24 March

27 March

28 March

29 March

30 March

Unknown date

April

1 April

7 April

8 April

12 April

13 April

14 April

15 April

16 April

17 April

20 April

22 April

23 April

28 April

29 April

30 April

Unknown date

May

1 May

3 May

4 May

14 May

15 May

18 May

21 May

24 May

26 May

Unknown date

June

1 June

2 June

3 June

5 June

6 June

15 June

16 June

18 June

19 June

25 June

28 June

Unknown date

July

2 July

8 July

13 July

18 July

19 July

23 July

25 July

27 July

29 July

Unknown date

August

2 August

3 August

4 August

6 August

8 August

10 August

11 August

12 August

13 August

16 August

17 August

19 August

24 August

26 August

27 August

29 August

30 August

31 August

Unknown date

September

1 September

2 September

3 September

4 September

5 September

7 September

10 September

11 September

13 September

14 September

15 September

17 September

18 September

19 September

22 September

25 September

26 September

27 September

28 September

29 September

30 September

Unknown date

October

1 October

3 October

4 October

6 October

7 October

8 October

11 October

12 October

13 October

14 October

15 October

18 October

22 October

23 October

24 October

25 October

26 October

27 October

30 October

31 October

Unknown date

November

2 November

3 November

5 November

6 November

11 November

12 November

13 November

15 November

16 November

17 November

18 November

19 November

20 November

21 November

22 November

23 November

24 November

25 November

26 November

27 November

30 November

Unknown date

December

1 December

2 December

3 December

4 December

5 December

6 December

7 December

8 December

9 December

10 December

11 December

12 December

14 December

15 December

16 December

17 December

18 December

21 December

22 December

23 December

24 December

25 December

28 December

29 December

Unknown date

Unknown date

References

1809